Susan Irene Rotroff  is an American classical archaeologist, classicist, and academic, specialising in the art, archaeology, and pottery of Ancient Greece. She was Jarvis Thurston and Mona Van Duyn Professor in the Humanities, at Washington University in St. Louis.

Early life and education
Rotroff studied for her Bachelor of Arts (AB) degree at Bryn Mawr College. Following graduation, she studied for one year at the American School of Classical Studies at Athens. She graduated from Princeton University, with a PhD in 1976.

Academic career
In 1995, Rotroff joined the faculty of the Classics Department at Washington University in St. Louis.

Honours
In 1988, she was awarded a fellowship by the MacArthur Fellows Program. In 2011 Rotroff was awarded the Gold Medal from the Archaeological Institute of America On 10 March 2016, she was elected a Fellow of the Society of Antiquaries of London (FSA).

Works
 The Athenian Agora XXXIII, Hellenistic Pottery: The Plain Wares, ASCSA, 2006, 
 The Athenian Agora XXIX, Hellenistic Pottery: Athenian and Imported Wheelmade Tableware. Princeton 1997.
The Romanization of Athens: proceedings of an international conference held at Lincoln, Nebraska (April 1996) Editors Michael C. Hoff, Susan I. Rotroff, Oxbow Books, 1997, 
 Debris from a Public Dining Room in the Athenian Agora. Hesperia, Supplement 25, Authors Susan I. Rotroff, John Howard Oakley, ASCSA, 1992, 
 Sardis Monograph 12: The Hellenistic Pottery from Sardis, Authors Susan I. Rotroff, Andrew Oliver, Ilse Hanfmann, George Maxim Anossov Hanfmann, Archaeological Exploration of Sardis, 2003, 
Hellenistic relief molds from the Athenian Agora, Volume 23 of Hesperia Supplement, Authors Clairève Grandjouan, Eileen Markson, Susan I. Rotroff, ASCSA, 1989, 
"Three Centuries of Hellenistic Terracottas", Hellenistic pottery and terracottas, Editors Homer A. Thompson, Dorothy Burr Thompson, Susan I. Rotroff, ASCSA, 1987, 
Hellenistic pottery: Athenian and imported moldmade bowls, Volume 22 of Athenian Agora, American School of Classical Studies at Athens, 1982, 
Women in the Athenian Agora, Authors Susan I. Rotroff, Robert Lamberton, ASCSA, 2006, 
Megarian bowls in the Athenian agora, Princeton., 1975

References

American archaeologists
Living people
Princeton University alumni
Washington University in St. Louis faculty
MacArthur Fellows
Year of birth missing (living people)
American women archaeologists
Fellows of the Society of Antiquaries of London
Bryn Mawr College alumni
Classical archaeologists
Hellenists
British women historians